Martyn Amos is a Professor in the Department of Computer and Information Sciences at Northumbria University, working in natural computation, crowd simulation, DNA computing and synthetic biology. He was born in Hexham, Northumberland in 1971, brought up in Heddon-on-the-Wall, and attended school in Ponteland. He graduated with a degree in Computer Science from Coventry University in 1993 (which included an industrial placement working on the Ministry of Defence (United Kingdom) Corporate Headquarters Office Technology System), before earning a Ph.D. in DNA computing in 1997, from the University of Warwick. He then held a Leverhulme Trust Special Research Fellowship at the University of Liverpool, before taking up permanent academic appointments at the University of Liverpool (2000–2002), the University of Exeter (2002–2006), and Manchester Metropolitan University (2006-2018). He is a Fellow of the British Computer Society (FBCS).

Bibliography

 — The first general text to cover the whole field.

 — A popular science style introduction to the topic.

 — A collection of "science into fiction" short stories, based on the themes of "unconventional computing" and artificial life, with accompanying afterwords written by consultant scientists.

References

Living people
British computer scientists
Alumni of Coventry University
People from Hexham
1971 births